is a Japanese dancer, actress and model. She is a former member of E-girls and represented by LDH.

Early life
Ishii was born on July 11, 1998, in Tokyo, Japan. She has an elder brother, a younger brother, and a younger sister named Chino Ishii, who is currently listed under Kizzy, an all-female dance group composed of EXPG students. Ishii started dancing when she was in her second year of primary school at her mother's encouragement. She was later scouted to join the Exile Professional Gym (EXPG) in her fifth grade when she took part in a dance competition. She debuted as a model in the U-15 fashion magazine nico☆puchi in 2010 before joining E-girls.

Career

Music career
In 2011, she was chosen through a nationwide audition process called "EXILE Presents VOCAL BATTLE AUDITION 3 ~For Girls~" in the dance performance category to be a member of a yet-to-debut dance and vocal group, bunny.

In October 2012, she officially joined E-girls line-up for their third single "Follow me".

In June 2014, due to scheduling conflicts with filming for Solomon's Perjury, Ishii announced that she would not participate in E-girls' first national tour, which was held between July and August that year.

On December 22, 2019, with the announcement of E-girls' disbandment set for around the end of 2020, it was revealed that Ishii would focus on acting and modeling activities afterwards.

Acting career
Ishii's acting debut was a cameo appearance in the first episode of Shiritsu Bakaleya Koukou, a Nippon TV drama which premiered in April 2012.

In 2014, she portrayed a blind piano prodigy in Koibumi Biyori, a drama starring 10 members of E-girls and a live-action adaptation of a manga of the same name authored by George Asakura. She then auditioned for a role in Solomon's Perjury, a 2015 film directed by Izuru Narushima. The audition was held nationwide and attracted approximately 10,000 aspiring young actors and actresses. Ishii was chosen to play the role of Miyake Juri, a vengeful and low self-esteemed girl who was bullied by a group of school delinquents for having bad skin.

Ishii landed her first starring role in a film, Girls Step which hit theaters in September 2015. This marked the first time that a member of E-girls had a lead role in a film. For her roles in Girls Step and Solomon's Perjury, Ishii won the 58th Blue Ribbon Best Newcomer Award. In 2016, her portrayal of Nagisa Arima, the passionate and earnest leader of the brass band club in Aogeba Tōtoshi, earned her the 5th Confidence Drama Best Newcomer Award. She also appeared in a live-action adaptation of Your lie in April where she played the role of Tsubaki Sawabe. The film was released on September 10, 2016.

In 2017, Ishii took on the role of Ayami Gotō, a problematic 17-year-old youth with family problems in an NHK drama, Okāsan, Musume wo Yamete ii desu ka?. Her next project was a four-episode NHK BS Premium mini drama starring Kenta Suga, Uso nante Hitotsu mo nai no. Kyota Fujimoto and Kentaro Hagiwara, who had previously teamed up for Shiseido's Maquillage face powder commercial short movie "Snow Beauty" starring Fumi Nikaido and Gen Hoshino, were respectively in charge of the screenplay and the direction of the drama. She also starred alongside Takayuki Yamada in a short film directed by Naomi Kawase, Parallel World, which premiered at the Short Shorts Film Festival & ASIA on June 1, and took on the role of Natsuki Nitō in a live-action adaptation of The Anthem of the Heart, which hit theaters on July 22.

In 2020 Ishii was announced to take part in her first stage play, the reading drama BOOK ACT "Entertainer Exchange Diary (Geinin koukan nikki)" alongside fellow LDH artists. She will also star in the film The Ashes of My Flesh and Blood is the Vast Flowing Galaxy (Kudake Chiru Tokoro wo Miseteageru) as Hari Kuramoto, a bullied first-grade high school student, alongside Taishi Nakagawa. The film was directed by Sabu and will be released on May 8, 2020. Furthermore, she will play the role of Satomi Sekiguchi in the remake of the popular 90s drama Tokyo Love Story which will be released in spring.

Endorsements
Ishii has appeared in a number of commercials, the most notable ones being her appearance as a countryside girl alongside Nana Komatsu in NTT DoCoMo d-Video CM directed by Tetsuya Nakashima, and in Japan Post CM with Masataka Kubota and Yoshiyoshi Arakawa.

Filmography
To see her appearances with E-girls, see E-girls

TV series

Films

Stage

Internet programs

Commercials

Music videos

Runways

Awards

References

External links
 
E-girls profile 

Japanese female dancers
1998 births
Living people
Actresses from Tokyo
LDH (company) artists